Dimitra Efxeinoupolis is an amateur football and basketball club, located in Efxeinoupoli and was found in 1959. It was formed from the merger of the football clubs Keraunos and Astrapis. The first president of the club was Stavros Laggouras who gave the name to the club. One of the most important presidents of the club was Konstadinos Michalakopoulos (Ελλ.Κωνσταντίνος Μιχαλακόπουλος). The name Dimitra was given because the majority of the citizens are farmers and in ancient Greek Mythology the God Demeter is the goddess of the harvest, who presided over grains and the fertility of the earth, while at the same time it was the name of his youngest daughter Demeter. After two years in B'epsth DIMITRA is now again in the first amateur division. DIMITRA took the promotion with the amazing record of 21-1 W/L.
 The football club is participating in A'1 Epsth, while the basketball team on A2' Eskath.
The stadium of the football club is Dimitra Efxeinoupolis and it has a capacity of 1500 attendant (150 seats)  while the basketball team use the Public Closed Basketball Court of Almyros, with a capacity of 350 seats.

Current squad

Football roster

Basketball roster

References

External pages
 Almyros Local Newspaper of South East Magnisia
 Site for the local community Business, local news, etc
 Website referring to the news of the teams of Greece
 Official blog for Dimitra Efxeinoupolis
 Personal site of coach Lefteris Kalogirou
 Website about the news of Magnisia and Greece
 Website about the athletic news of Magnisia and the rest of the Greece
Municipality Of Almyros official webpage
Official Facebook of the basketball team
Official Facebook of the football team

Basketball teams in Greece
Football teams in Greece